Thorburn Brailsford Robertson (4 March 1884 – 18 January 1930), generally known as Brailsford Robertson, was an Australian physiologist and biochemist.

Early life
Robertson was born in Edinburgh, the son of Thorburn Robertson and Sheila, daughter of William Brailsford. At eight years of age he was brought to South Australia, where his father had been appointed a mining engineer. He was educated at Miss Stanton's school at Glenelg and later was privately tutored for the university. He entered on the science course at the University of Adelaide in 1902, and was at once recognized as a brilliant student. In April 1905 he graduated B.Sc. with first-class honours in physiology. As a student he had given some evidence of his quality in a paper on the "Sham-death reflex in spiders", published in the Journal of Physiology for August 1904, and in a remarkable paper, "An Outline of a Theory of the Genesis of Protoplasmic Motion and Excitation", read at a meeting of the Royal Society of South Australia on 4 April 1905 and published in its Transactions and Proceedings, vol. XXIX, pages 1–56.

Career

Robertson had been very interested in the work of Professor Jacques Loeb of the University of California, one of the ablest biochemists of his time, and immediately after graduation obtained a position in his laboratory. There he worked for five years, contributing during this period around 40 papers to leading scientific journals, and establishing a reputation as an authority on proteins. He never lacked courage, and thus early in his career attacked and subsequently refuted many of the doctrines then generally accepted. In 1910 when Loeb went to the Rockefeller Institute, New York, Robertson became assistant professor of bio-chemistry and pharmacology. In 1912 he published Die Physikalische Chemie der Proteine, which was translated into Russian, and, extended and revised, was published in English in 1918. Between 1910 and 1918 he regularly sent papers to the scientific journals, many of them concerned with the factors that govern the growth and longevity of animals. He became professor of bio-chemistry and pharmacology at the University of California in 1916 and two years later was given the chair of bio-chemistry at University of Toronto.

In 1919 the death of his old teacher, Sir Edward Stirling, led to his return to Adelaide, where he became professor of bio-chemistry and general physiology in 1920. There his energetic personality soon became apparent in the medical school. His influence was felt in a remodelling of the early years of the medical course, and he persuaded the council that the teaching would have to be divided. In 1922 the new chair of zoology was established. He published in 1920 at New York his Principles of Biochemistry (2nd ed. 1923), and The Chemical Basis of Growth and Senescence in 1923. He had been experimenting on these problems since 1914, and though he was devoting much time to other work, they remained a constant hobby with him for the rest of his life. He was one of the earliest in Australia to investigate the use of insulin for diabetes, and in 1923 he discovered tethelin, a growth controlling substance which has been found of great value in the treatment of slow-healing wounds and ulcers of long standing.

In 1927 Robertson was asked by the Commonwealth Council for Scientific and Industrial Research to take charge of investigations into the nutrition of animals. An animal nutrition laboratory was built at Adelaide, and field stations were established in Queensland, New South Wales, Victoria and South Australia. Some especially valuable research work was done in connexion with the growth of wool on sheep, and the value of cystine and phosphates as supplementary feeding.

His doctoral students include Roy Elwood Clausen, Carl L. A. Schmidt, and Selman Waksman.

Late life
He was working with great energy, with much mapped out for the coming years, when he contracted pneumonia and died after a short illness on 18 January 1930. He married in 1910 Jane Winifred, third daughter of Sir Edward Stirling. She survived him with two sons and a daughter. He was a fellow of the American Association for the Advancement of Science, and of many other important societies. He was elected a foreign member of the Accademia Nazionale dei Lincei, Rome, in 1926. In addition to the books already mentioned he published in 1914 The Universe and the Mayonnaise and other Stories for Children, and in 1931 a collection of excellent articles of more general appeal than his scientific papers was published under the title The Spirit of Research. He was the virtual founder and was managing editor of the Australian Journal of Experimental Biology and Medical Science from its beginning until his death. Its ninth volume published in 1932, "The Robertson Memorial Volume", is made up of scientific papers contributed by former colleagues and pupils, with a short memoir by Hedley R. Marston, and a bibliography of his work which lists 174 of his articles, and 26 others of which he was part author.

References

G. E. Rogers, 'Robertson, Thorburn Brailsford (1884 - 1930)', Australian Dictionary of Biography, Volume 11, MUP, 1988, pp 420–421.

Additional resources listed by the Australian Dictionary of Biography:
T. B. Robertson and W. H. Bagot, An Account of the Darling Building (Adel, 1922)
W. G. K. Duncan and R. A. Leonard, The University of Adelaide, 1874-1974 (Adel, 1973)
Medical Journal of Australia, 22 Feb 1930, p 268
Royal Society of South Australia, Transactions, 1930
Gerontologia, 4, no 70, 1960
Chronicle (Adelaide), 23 Jan 1930
The Times (London), 28 Jan 1930
PRG 136/1/2 and D5390 (State Library of South Australia)
CSIRO Archives (Canberra).

1884 births
1930 deaths
Australian physiologists
Australian biochemists
Australian people of Scottish descent